
Lake Niancocha (possibly from Quechua nina fire qucha lake,) is a lake in Peru, in the Ancash Region, Bolognesi Province, Huallanca District. Niancocha is northeast of the Huayhuash mountain range, south of the lake Condorcocha and northwest of Chonta mountain.

References 

Lakes of Peru
Lakes of Ancash Region